Club Sportif Case-Pilote is a football club of Martinique, playing in the town Case-Pilote.

Founded in 1937 by Omer Kromwell, they play in the Martinique's first division, the Martinique Championnat National. The stadium is named after the founder of the club.

Achievements
Coupe de la Martinique: 3
1977, 2006, 2010

The club in the French football structure
French Cup: 1 appearance
2001/02

External links
 Le Cs Case-Pilote: la voix du nord caraïbe – Antilles-Foot 
 2007/08 Club info – Antilles-Foot

References

Football clubs in Martinique
Association football clubs established in 1937
1937 establishments in Martinique